New Corinth is an unincorporated community in Grainger County, Tennessee, United States.

References

Unincorporated communities in Grainger County, Tennessee
Unincorporated communities in Tennessee